Ivan Itkin (March 29, 1936 – April 5, 2020) was an American politician who served as a Democratic member of the Pennsylvania House of Representatives from 1973 to 1998. He was the Democratic nominee for Governor of Pennsylvania in 1998.

Early life
Itkin was born in New York City on March 9, 1936. In 1956, he graduated from the Polytechnic Institute of Brooklyn with a bachelor's degree in Chemical Engineering. Itkin went on to receive a master's degree from New York University in Nuclear Engineering in 1957.  After a stint working as a reactor physicist at Westinghouse Bettis Atomic Power Laboratory Itkin received a Ph.D. in mathematics from the University of Pittsburgh in 1964. He worked as a nuclear scientist and applied mathematician until 1972, when he was elected to the Pennsylvania House of Representatives' 23rd District, which includes portions of Allegheny County.

Political career

State House of Representatives
Itkin held a variety of leadership positions with the House's Democratic caucus. He served as majority whip from 1990 though 1992. He was elected majority leader in 1992, and minority whip in 1994. He was also appointed Speaker Pro Tempore during the 1987-1988 session.

Candidate for governor

Itkin ran against Republican incumbent Tom Ridge. He and his running mate, former Congresswoman Marjorie Margolies-Mezvinsky, lost the election with 31% of the vote.

Later career
Itkin retired from the House following his gubernatorial defeat and was subsequently appointed Director of the Office of Civilian Radioactive Waste Management in the Department of Energy by President Bill Clinton in 1999.

He died of heart failure on April 5, 2020, in Fort Lauderdale, Florida at age 84.

References

External links
 PA State Archives: Ivan Itkin

|-

|-

|-

|-

1936 births
2020 deaths
American nuclear physicists
Candidates in the 1998 United States elections
20th-century American politicians
Democratic Party members of the Pennsylvania House of Representatives
Politicians from New York City
Polytechnic Institute of New York University alumni
University of Pittsburgh alumni
Scientists from New York (state)